Jack McGee may refer to:
 Jack McGee (actor) (born 1949), American television and film actor
 Jack McGee (aviator) (1885–1918), American aviator
 Jack McGee (Canadian football) (1932–2009), Canadian football player and car dealership owner

See also
John McGee (disambiguation)